Marie-Christine Schmidt (born August 19, 1986 in LaSalle, Quebec) is a Canadian sprint kayaker. She won a gold medal at the 2007 Pan American Games in the women's K-2 500 metres event, alongside Kia Byers.

See also
List of Canoe/Kayak athletes by Country

References
Canadian Olympic Committee

1986 births
Living people
Canadian female canoeists
Canoeists at the 2007 Pan American Games
Canoeists from Montreal
People from LaSalle, Quebec
Pan American Games gold medalists for Canada
Pan American Games medalists in canoeing
Medalists at the 2007 Pan American Games